Special routes of U.S. Route 127 may refer to:

Special routes of U.S. Route 127 in Kentucky, five business and bypass routes
Business routes of U.S. Route 127 in Michigan, ten business routes